Becky Creek Wildlife Management Area is located on  south of Huttonsville in Randolph County, West Virginia.  The terrain at Becky Creek is steep, and is covered with second-growth hardwood forest.  Camping is permitted in the designated area.  Camping is also available at nearby Kumbrabow State Forest.

Becky Creek derives its name from a local pioneer whose name is variously cited as either Becky or Beckay.

Hunting and Trapping

Hunting opportunities include bear, deer, and turkey.  Opportunities to trap for fur can include bobcat, fox and raccoon.

See also
Animal conservation
Bear bag
Kumbrabow State Forest
List of West Virginia wildlife management areas

References

External links
West Virginia DNR District 3 Wildlife Management Areas

Wildlife management areas of West Virginia
Protected areas of Randolph County, West Virginia